The Greater Los Angeles area is home to many professional and collegiate sports teams and has hosted many national and international sporting events. The metropolitan area has twelve major league professional teams: the Los Angeles Lakers, the Los Angeles Dodgers, the Los Angeles Rams, the Los Angeles Clippers, the Los Angeles Angels, LA Galaxy, Los Angeles FC, the Los Angeles Kings, the Los Angeles Chargers, Los Angeles Sparks, the Anaheim Ducks, and Angel City FC of the National Women's Soccer League. The Los Angeles metropolitan area is home to nine universities whose teams compete in various NCAA Division I level sports, most notably the UCLA Bruins and USC Trojans. Between them, these Los Angeles area sports teams have won a combined 105 championship titles. Los Angeles area colleges have produced upwards of 200 national championship teams.

Los Angeles is home to a variety of sporting venues including the two National Historic Landmarks, the Los Angeles Memorial Coliseum and the Rose Bowl, the multi-purpose arena, Crypto.com Arena, and the roof-covered SoFi Stadium. Los Angeles hosted the 1932 and 1984 Summer Olympics. In 2028, the city will host the Olympics for a third time. Los Angeles also hosted games of the 1994 FIFA World Cup including the final match, and is scheduled to host matches during the 2026 FIFA World Cup. LA recently hosted both the MLB All-Star Game and the MLS All-Star Game in 2021 and 2022 respectively. Los Angeles also hosted the College Football Playoff National Championship in 2023 and Super Bowl LVI in 2022, the eighth such event in Los Angeles. The USGA has also decided to bring the Golf US Open back to Los Angeles in 2023 and will be hosted in the Los Angeles Country Club. The geography and weather of Los Angeles also make Los Angeles a hub for surfing, and beach volleyball. When the Rams won Super Bowl LVI, the city of Los Angeles became the second city in the 21st century (the first was Boston) to have at least one championship in the four major pro sports and the second to ever have championships in four major professional leagues within a ten-year span, accomplishing this feat in a span of seven years, and eight months (from the Kings' championship win on June 13, 2014 to the Rams' championship win on February 13, 2022).

Major league professional teams

Greater Los Angeles is home to 14 major sports teams, ten professional major league teams and four from the top level collegiate ranks—MLB, MLS, the NBA, the NFL, the NHL, and the PAC-12.  There is also a WNBA team, a NWSL and two PAC-12 basketball teams of the respective top women's leagues.

Former teams

Baseball 

The Los Angeles area is one of four metropolitan areas to host two Major League Baseball teams—the Los Angeles Dodgers in the National League and the Los Angeles Angels in the American League.

The Dodgers were founded in Brooklyn, New York in 1883; they officially adopted the name Dodgers in 1932. The team moved to Los Angeles before the 1958 season and played four consecutive seasons at Los Angeles Memorial Coliseum before they moved to their current home stadium, Dodger Stadium, in 1962. The Dodgers are one of the most valuable franchises in MLB. They have won seven World Series championships and 24 National League pennants. Eleven NL MVP award winners have played for the Dodgers, winning a total of thirteen MVP Awards; eight Cy Young Award winners have also pitched for the Dodgers, winning a total of twelve Cy Young Awards. The team has even had eighteen Rookie of the Year Award winners, twice as many as the next closest team, including four consecutive from 1979 to 1982 and five consecutive from 1992 to 1996. Los Angeles and the Dodgers are set to host the MLB All-Star Game in the summer of 2022.

The Los Angeles Angels were established as one of the league's first two expansion teams in 1961 by Gene Autry. The Los Angeles Angels played their home games at Los Angeles Wrigley Field and moved in 1962 to newly built Dodger Stadium, which the Angels referred to as Chavez Ravine, where they were tenants of the Dodgers through 1965. In 1966, they moved to current home, Angel Stadium in Anaheim. In 2002, the Angels won their first and only American League pennant and World Series when they defeated the San Francisco Giants 4–3. The Angels have had many award winners including six AL MVP award winners by four players, two Cy Young Award winners and three Rookie of the Year Award winners.

Basketball 

Los Angeles boasts two National Basketball Association (NBA) teams, the Los Angeles Lakers and the Los Angeles Clippers. Both share the Crypto.com Arena (formerly the Staples Center). The Lakers are one of the most valuable franchises in the NBA and have gained a considerable fanbase over the years. They have the most championships of all current Los Angeles franchises, having gained 12 titles in LA and 17 overall, the joint most in the NBA along with the Boston Celtics. The Lakers were founded as the Minneapolis Lakers, having moved to Southern California in 1960.

The LA Clippers were founded as the Buffalo Braves in 1970; in 1978, the team moved to San Diego and changed the nickname to Clippers; the team re-located from San Diego in 1984. They were one of three expansion teams to join the NBA that year, along with the Cleveland Cavaliers and Portland Trail Blazers. The Braves saw some success and reached the playoffs three times, led by league Most Valuable Player (MVP) Bob McAdoo. Conflicts with the Canisius Golden Griffins over the Buffalo Memorial Auditorium and the sale of the franchise led to them relocating from Buffalo to San Diego.

When he died in 2013, Lakers owner Jerry Buss also owned the city's WNBA franchise, the Los Angeles Sparks, which also plays at Crypto.com Arena. His family still owns the Lakers, but has since sold the Sparks to Guggenheim Partners, the current owners of the Dodgers. One year later, longtime Clippers owner Donald Sterling was banned from the NBA after derogatory statements he made became public, and was subsequently forced to sell the team. The franchise was purchased by former Microsoft executive Steve Ballmer in August 2014. The Clippers plan to build a new arena in Inglewood, across from SoFi Stadium, by 2024 when their lease with Crypto.com Arena expires.

Football 
 

The region has two National Football League (NFL) teams: the Los Angeles Rams and the Los Angeles Chargers. The Rams originally played in LA from 1946 to 1994, while the Chargers shared LA with them for only one season in 1960 before moving to San Diego.

Los Angeles did not have an NFL team in between the 1994 season and the 2016 season. Immediately after the 1994 season, the Los Angeles Rams moved from suburban Anaheim, California, to St. Louis, Missouri, and the Los Angeles Raiders returned to Oakland, California, after playing 13 years in the L.A. Memorial Coliseum (1982–1994) and winning Super Bowl XVIII. Between 1995 and 2016, there were multiple failed stadium proposals to bring back the NFL to Los Angeles and teams threatening to move in. On January 12, 2016, NFL owners voted 30–2 to allow the then St. Louis Rams to move back to Los Angeles and allow for the construction of the stadium proposed by Rams owner Stan Kroenke over a plan proposed by the Oakland Raiders and the San Diego Chargers. The Chargers would still follow through with a move to Los Angeles a year later in 2017. The Rams and Chargers play their home games at the 70,240-seat SoFi Stadium in Inglewood. 2017 marked the first time since 1960 that the Rams and Chargers shared the same market and the first time since 1994 that the market had two NFL teams. The Los Angeles Rams won Super Bowl LVI at SoFi Stadium in 2022 making them only the second NFL team to win the Super Bowl on home turf after the Tampa Bay Buccaneers in 2020.

Prior to the NFL, Los Angeles had multiple teams in the American Football League. The Los Angeles Wildcats, also called "Wilson Wildcats", were a traveling team for the first AFL in 1926. The Los Angeles Bulldogs were members of AFL II (1937) and a minor AFL (1939) before joining the Pacific Coast Professional Football League. The original Los Angeles Chargers were a charter member of AFL IV, becoming the San Diego Chargers in 1961. The Los Angeles Mustangs were members of the short-lived American Football League in 1944. From 1983 to 1985, the Los Angeles Express was a team in the United States Football League.

Ice hockey

The region has two NHL teams — the Los Angeles Kings, which entered the league when it doubled in size in 1967, and the Anaheim Ducks, which joined in 1993 as the Mighty Ducks of Anaheim.

The Kings were founded on June 5, 1967, after Jack Kent Cooke was awarded an NHL expansion franchise for Los Angeles on February 9, 1966, becoming one of the six teams that began play as part of the 1967 NHL expansion. Prior to the Kings arrival in the Los Angeles area, both the Pacific Coast Hockey League (PCHL) and the Western Hockey League (WHL) had several teams in California, including the PCHL's Los Angeles Monarchs of the 1930s and the WHL's Los Angeles Blades of the 1960s. The Kings have won two Stanley Cup titles in 2012 and 2014.

The Ducks were founded in 1993 by The Walt Disney Company with an entrance fee of $50 million, half of which Disney paid to the Los Angeles Kings as compensation for sharing the Southern California NHL market. On March 1, 1993, at the brand-new Anaheim Arena – located a short distance east of Disneyland and across the Orange Freeway from Angel Stadium – the team received its name, inspired by the 1992 Disney movie The Mighty Ducks. As a result of the name adoption, the arena was named "The Pond", and Disney subsequently made an animated series called Mighty Ducks, featuring a fictional Mighty Ducks of Anaheim team consisting of anthropomorphized ducks led by the Mighty Ducks' mascot, Wildwing. The Ducks have won the Stanley Cup once in 2007.

Soccer 

The Los Angeles area hosts two teams in Major League Soccer (MLS), the top flight of the men's sport in the United States: the LA Galaxy, a charter member of the league, and Los Angeles FC, which began play in 2018. The Galaxy have won five MLS Cups, more than any other MLS team. The two teams play in "El Tráfico", the cross-town derby. Chivas USA was a member of Major League Soccer starting in 2005, but was shut down by the league in 2014.

Before MLS was created, the Los Angeles Wolves of the United Soccer Association (USA) and the Los Angeles Toros of the National Professional Soccer League (NPSL) both had its first season in 1967. The Wolves won the USA Final in 1967, defeating the Washington Whips 6–5 at the L.A. Memorial Coliseum. When both leagues merged to form the North American Soccer League (NASL), the Wolves remained in Los Angeles while the Toros relocated and became the San Diego Toros in 1968. When the first season ended, both teams folded. Later, the NASL returned a team to Los Angeles by establishing the Los Angeles Aztecs in 1974, but folded in 1981. In their first season as an expansion franchise, the Aztecs captured the 1974 NASL championship, defeating the Miami Toros in a penalty shoot-out after a 3–3 draw. Notable players for the Aztecs include Manchester United's George Best and Dutch superstar Johan Cruyff. Anaheim was represented in the NASL by the California Surf from 1978 to 1981.

The Los Angeles Lazers was owned by Jerry Buss and played in the MISL from 1982 to 1988. Buss again owned the Los Angeles United in the CISL but after one season (1993) sold the team. The United relocated to Anaheim and became Anaheim Splash playing from 1993 - 1997 then folding as well.

The area has one past and one current team in U.S. women's professional soccer. The Los Angeles Sol played one season (2009) of Women's Professional Soccer before folding. The area then went more than a decade without a top-flight team, either in WPS or in the current National Women's Soccer League, until an NWSL franchise was granted in 2020; the new side, since unveiled as Angel City FC, started play in March 2022.

Major league professional championships

Los Angeles Rams (NFL) 
1 NFL championship (pre–Super Bowl)
 1951

1 Super Bowl title
 2021 (LVI)

Los Angeles Raiders (NFL) 
1 Super Bowl title
 1983 (XVIII)

Los Angeles Wolves (NASL) 
1 NASL Final title
 1967

Los Angeles Aztecs (NASL) 
1 NASL Final title
 1974

Los Angeles Galaxy (MLS) 
5 MLS Cup titles
 2002
 2005
 2011
 2012
 2014

Los Angeles FC (MLS) 
1 MLS Cup title
 2022

Los Angeles Dodgers (MLB) 
6 World Series titles
 1959
 1963
 1965
 1981
 1988
 2020

Anaheim / Los Angeles Angels (MLB) 
1 World Series titles
 2002

Los Angeles Lakers (NBA) 
12 NBA Finals titles
 1972
 1980
 1982
 1985
 1987
 1988
 2000
 2001
 2002
 2009
 2010
 2020

Los Angeles Kings (NHL) 
2 Stanley Cup titles
 2012
 2014

Anaheim Ducks (NHL) 
1 Stanley Cup title
 2007

Los Angeles Sparks (WNBA) 
3 WNBA Finals titles
 2001
 2002
 2016

Other sports in Los Angeles

Mixed Martial Arts (MMA) 

The sport of Mixed Martial Arts (in the U.S.) was first conceived of and created in the Los Angeles area. Rorion Gracie and Art Davie co-created the MMA promotion, the Ultimate Fighting Championship (the UFC), in 1993 out of Torrance, CA, under the War of the Worlds (W.O.W.) promotion company.  The sport of Mixed Martial Arts slowly developed in its first decade. By the year 2005, the UFC had grown into a viable fight promotion company and the sport of MMA was on its way to becoming a mainstream sport in the U.S. and around the world.

In its relatively brief history, the sport of MMA has been well represented by fighters natives of Los Angeles and of California. From Frank Shamrock (Los Angeles) and Tito Oritz (Huntington Beach) in the early era of the sport, to Gilbert Melendez (Santa Ana) and Dan Henderson (Downey) throughout the mid-era of the sport, to Ronda Rousey (Riverside), Henry Cejudo (Los Angeles), Tony Ferguson (Oxnard) as of late.

Surfing 

The warm mediterranean climate as well as the miles of a scenic coastline with a variety of wave types from Malibu to the South Bay, Los Angeles is one of the favorite destinations to both amateurs and professional surfers across the world. Every summer of each year, Huntington Beach hosts the US Open of Surfing, the largest surfing competition in the world. Many other surfing events including the International Surf Festival, Surfing Dog Contests, and Ventura's Surf Rodeo are held annually in several Los Angeles County beach cities.

Beach Volleyball 

Santa Monica is believed to be the birthplace of beach volleyball in the early 1920s. The weather, the vast sand area and the abundant permanent courts make Los Angeles one of the hotspots for beach volleyball. The first official Beach Volleyball World Championships was held in Los Angeles in from 10 to 13, 1997. Beach Volleyball has been an official Olympic sport since 1996, and during the 2028 Olympics, beach volleyball will be played as an Olympic sport for the first time in the city of Los Angeles. Additionally, many other local beach volleyball tournaments for players of all skill levels are held by multiple entities in various beaches across the Los Angeles metropolitan area. In 2017, CBVA, California Beach Volleyball Association, hosted nearly 1,000 tournaments at 23 beaches in 11 skill or age divisions. There are approximately 8,000 members from California and beyond.

Minor league and semi-professional teams

American football
The Los Angeles Wildcats were an XFL team that began play in the league's inaugural 2020 season at Dignity Health Sports Park. The Los Angeles Xtreme were a member of the original XFL begun by Vince McMahon of World Wrestling Entertainment and by NBC, a major television network in the United States. The team played its home games in the Los Angeles Memorial Coliseum in the spring of 2001 and won the only championship in XFL history as the league folded after only one season.

Before the Arena Football League collapsed after the 2008 season, the league included the Los Angeles Cobras, the Anaheim Piranhas, and the Los Angeles Avengers. The Cobras played one season at the Los Angeles Sports Arena before folding, mostly due to lack of attendance. The Piranhas played at the then named Arrowhead Pond for two seasons, 1996 and 1997, before folding. The Avengers played their home games at the Staples Center until they folded as well. The AFL was revived in 2010 and returned to the Los Angeles area in 2014 with a new team, the Los Angeles Kiss. The team, owned by a group that included Gene Simmons and Paul Stanley, members of the rock band KISS, played in Anaheim at the Honda Center until folding in 2016.

Australian rules football

In Australian rules football, the Los Angeles Dragons and the Orange County Giants of the United States Australian Football League both play in the Greater Los Angeles region.

Baseball
The collegiate level East Los Angeles Dodgers and their rival the Orange County Angels in the Southern California Collegiate Baseball League.

Basketball
The metropolitan area has two teams in the NBA G League; each is owned by one of the area's two NBA teams. The Ontario Clippers play in Ontario, and the South Bay Lakers play in El Segundo.

Previously, the Anaheim Arsenal played in the region for three season from 2006 to 2009 before relocating to Springfield, Massachusetts.

Gaelic football
The amateur sport of Gaelic football has been played in Los Angeles since the early 20th century. Los Angeles were national champions in 1959.

The Cougars GFC were founded in 2015 and play and train on the westside of Los Angeles. Primarily in Culver City/Santa Monica area. The Cougars season consists of attending tournaments in nearby San Diego, Colorado and the annual USGAA Nationals Championship. As of 2018, the Cougars membership consisted of approximately 50 members (male and female) with the club being 55% American, 45% Irish, some being complete beginners.

The Cougars also play in a 3-game series against their local rivals, The Wild Geese Gaelic Football Club, Inc. founded in 1978 who administers Gaelic football activities in nearby Orange County.

Ice hockey
The Ontario Reign was an ECHL team from 2008 to 2015. After a team swap with Manchester, New Hampshire, the new Ontario Reign began play in the American Hockey League in 2015.
In 1995 IHL Los Angeles Ice Dogs played one season 1995-1996 at the Los Angeles Memorial Sports Arena. Due to lack of attendance, moved to the Long Beach Arena for the 1996-1997 season and became the Long Beach Ice Dogs through 2007. The team played in three different 2nd-division professional hockey leagues during their time in Los Angeles/Long Beach; IHL 1995-2000, WCHL 2000-2003, & the ECHL 2003-2007.

Lacrosse
Major League Lacrosse was represented with the Los Angeles Riptide from 2006 to 2008. The Anaheim Storm was a member of the indoor National Lacrosse League. They played at the Arrowhead Pond, now the Honda Center from 2004 to 2005. After the 2005 season, the Storm suspended operations due to low attendance

Rugby league
Los Angeles's rugby league team the Los Angeles Raiders RLFC are a developing team in the USA Rugby League, formed in 2011. They were aimed to compete as a full team in 2012.

Rugby union
The Los Angeles area has had several amateur clubs. It is home to the Santa Monica Rugby Club, which competes in the Pacific Rugby Premiership and is a member of USA Rugby. The Los Angeles Rugby Club is the second oldest club in the Southern California Rugby Football Union. The Club was founded in 1958 as the Universities Rugby Club. Founding members included Al Williams and Dick Hyland, members of the Gold Medal winning 1924 USA Olympic Rugby Team. Other rugby clubs include the LA Rebellion and the San Fernando Valley Rugby Club.

In 2021, the area added its first professional club in the LA Giltinis, an expansion team in Major League Rugby.

Soccer
The Los Angeles area also has multiple clubs in the USL Championship, USL League Two, the National Independent Soccer Association, the United Premier Soccer League and the National Premier Soccer League scattered throughout the region: Orange County SC, Santa Ana Winds FC, LA Wolves FC, Moreno Valley FC, FC Golden State Force, Southern California Seahorses, Ventura County Fusion, City of Angels FC, Deportivo Coras USA, Orange County FC, Oxnard Guerreros FC, SoCal SC, and Temecula FC, to name some. The area will eventually have two teams in MLS Next Pro, a third-level league owned and operated by MLS that consists almost entirely of reserve sides of MLS teams. LA Galaxy II, currently playing in the USL Championship, will move to Next Pro in 2023, and will be joined that season by a new, as-yet-unnamed reserve side for Los Angeles FC.

In addition, the Santa Clarita Blue Heat play in United Women's Soccer.

Ultimate
The Los Angeles Aviators are a member of the twenty-four team American Ultimate Disc League (AUDL), a professional ultimate frisbee league spanning the United States and Canada. The Aviators are one of six teams currently competing in the Western Division, and play a fourteen-game regular season against the five other teams in the division: San Francisco FlameThrowers, San Diego Growlers, Seattle Cascades, and San Jose Spiders.

Los Angeles Astra, a women's professional ultimate frisbee team, was set to debut in 2020 as part of the Western Ultimate League. Their inaugural season in 2020 was canceled due to COVID-19.

Former minor professional teams

College 

The metropolitan area boasts 10 NCAA Division I athletic programs. The best-known are the two whose football teams compete in the top-level Football Bowl Subdivision, both of which are in the city of Los Angeles proper:

 UCLA Bruins — Winners of 116 national team championships, and 259 individual national championships (364 total national championships).
 USC Trojans — Winners of 105 national team championships, and 357 individual national championships (448 total national championships).

USC has 11 national championships in football and 7 Heisman Trophy winners. In men's basketball, UCLA has won more titles than any other school (11).
USC has also famously produced more Olympians, overall medalists, and gold medalists than any other American university. If USC were a country entering the 2016 Olympics, its record of 288 all-time medals would place it at rank 16 among all participating countries.

The area's other Division I programs are:
 Also in Los Angeles proper:
 Cal State Northridge Matadors, in the San Fernando Valley
 Loyola Marymount Lions, near Los Angeles International Airport
 In Malibu:
 Pepperdine Waves
 In Long Beach:
 Long Beach State Beach, or "The Beach"
 In Orange County:
 Cal State Fullerton Titans
 UC Irvine Anteaters
 In Riverside, one of the main cities of the Inland Empire:
 California Baptist Lancers
 UC Riverside Highlanders

Stadiums 

Los Angeles is home to some of the most famous sports venues in the world. L.A. venues have hosted generations of legendary athletes and historic games, including two Olympiads (3rd scheduled for 2028), three Super Bowls (4th scheduled for 2022), the World Series, NBA and WNBA championships, the Stanley Cup, the FIFA World Cup, the MLS Cup, NCAA championships.

Dodger Stadium 

Dodger Stadium is located in the Elysian Park neighborhood of Los Angeles, California, is the home field of Major League Baseball's Los Angeles Dodgers. Opened on April 10, 1962, it was constructed in less than three years at a cost of US$ 23 million. It is the oldest ballpark in MLB west of the Mississippi River, and third-oldest overall, after Fenway Park in Boston (1912) and Wrigley Field in Chicago (1914), and is the world's largest baseball stadium by seat capacity. Often referred to as a "pitcher's ballpark", the stadium has seen twelve no-hitters, two of which were perfect games.

The stadium hosted the Major League Baseball All-Star Game in 1980—and will host in 2022—as well as games of 10 World Series (1963, 1965, 1966, 1974, 1977, 1978, 1981, 1988, 2017, and 2018). It also hosted the semifinals and finals of the 2009 and 2017 World Baseball Classics. It also hosted exhibition baseball during the 1984 Summer Olympics. It will also host baseball and softball during the 2028 Summer Olympics. The stadium is also one of the greatest entertainment venues in the country, hosting special events that range from the Beatles to the Pope.

Los Angeles Memorial Coliseum 

Los Angeles Memorial Coliseum is located in the Exposition Park neighborhood of Los Angeles, California. The stadium serves as the home to the University of Southern California(USC) Trojans football team. It was also the temporary home of the Los Angeles Rams before the completion of SoFi Stadium in Inglewood July 2020. The facility had a permanent seating capacity of 93,607 for USC football and Rams games, making it the largest football stadium in the Pac-12 Conference and the NFL. A 2018 renovation reduced capacity to 77,500. Conceived as a hallmark of civic pride, the Coliseum was commissioned in 1921 as a memorial to L.A. veterans of World War I. Completed in 1923, it will be the first stadium to have hosted the Summer Olympics three times: 1932, 1984, and 2028. It was declared a National Historic Landmark on July 27, 1984, the day before the opening ceremony of the 1984 Summer Olympics. The Coliseum is jointly owned by the State of California, Los Angeles County, City of Los Angeles and is managed and operated by the Auxiliary Services Department of the University of Southern California.

Rose Bowl Stadium 

The Rose Bowl is a sport stadium, located in Pasadena, California, a northeast suburb of Los Angeles. Opened in October 1922, the stadium is recognized as a National Historic Landmark and a California Historic Civil Engineering landmark. At a modern capacity of an all-seated configuration at 92,542, the Rose Bowl is the 15th-largest stadium in the world, the 11th-largest stadium in the United States, and the 10th largest NCAA stadium. the Rose Bowl is one of the most famous venues in sporting history,  Since 1982, it has also served as the home stadium of the UCLA Bruins football team. The stadium has also hosted five Super Bowl games, second most of any venue. The Rose Bowl is also a noted soccer venue, having hosted the 1994 FIFA World Cup Final, 1999 FIFA Women's World Cup Final, and the 1984 Olympic Gold Medal Match, as well as numerous CONCACAF and United States Soccer Federation matches.

Crypto.com Arena 

Crypto.com Arena is a multi-purpose arena in Downtown Los Angeles located next to the Los Angeles Convention Center complex along Figueroa Street. The arena opened as Staples Center on October 17, 1999, adopting its current name on Christmas Day 2021. The arena is home venue to the Los Angeles Kings of the National Hockey League (NHL), the Los Angeles Lakers and the Los Angeles Clippers of the National Basketball Association (NBA), and the Los Angeles Sparks of the Women's National Basketball Association (WNBA). The Los Angeles Avengers of the Arena Football League (AFL) and the Los Angeles D-Fenders of the NBA D-League were also tenants; the Avengers were folded in 2009, and the D-Fenders (since renamed the South Bay Lakers) moved to the Lakers' practice facility at the Toyota Sports Center in El Segundo, California for the 2011–12 season. Staples Center is also host to over 250 events and nearly 4 million guests each year. It is the only arena in the NBA shared by two teams, as well as one of only three North American professional sports venues to host two teams from the same league. The other two are MetLife Stadium, the home of the National Football League's New York Giants and New York Jets, and SoFi Stadium, to be discussed immediately below. Crypto.com Arena is the venue of the Grammy Awards ceremony and will host the basketball competition during the 2028 Summer Olympics.

SoFi Stadium

SoFi Stadium, known as Los Angeles Stadium at Hollywood Park during its planning stages, is an ETFE roof–covered stadium and entertainment complex in the suburb of Inglewood.

The stadium is home to the Los Angeles Rams and Los Angeles Chargers of the National Football League (NFL). It is also scheduled to host Super Bowl LVI in February 2022 and the College Football Playoff National Championship in January 2023. During the 2028 Summer Olympics, the stadium is expected to host the opening and closing ceremonies, as well as soccer. Archery will be held on the grounds outside the stadium.

SoFi Stadium is the third stadium, and second to be in current use, since the 1970 AFL–NFL merger to be shared by two NFL teams (MetLife Stadium, in East Rutherford, New Jersey, is home to the New York Giants and New York Jets, as was its predecessor, Giants Stadium). It will be the fourth facility in the Los Angeles area to host multiple teams from the same league as Staples Center is home to both of the city's National Basketball Association (NBA) teams, the Los Angeles Clippers and Los Angeles Lakers, Dignity Health Sports Park for a time hosted both the LA Galaxy and now-defunct Chivas USA of Major League Soccer, and Dodger Stadium hosted the Los Angeles Dodgers and Los Angeles Angels from 1962 to 1965.

The stadium is a component of Hollywood Park, a master planned neighborhood in development on the site of the former Hollywood Park Racetrack. Hollywood Park Casino opened in October 2016, becoming the first establishment to open on the property.

List of Los Angeles venues

Olympic and Paralympic Games
Los Angeles hosted the Summer Olympic Games twice. The city first hosted the games in 1932 and hosted once again in 1984. Los Angeles has made a total of ten Summer Olympic bids in its history, more than any other city. Los Angeles along with Athens (1896, 2004), Paris (1900, 1924) and Tokyo (1964, 2020) are the four cities that have hosted the Summer Olympic Games twice. Los Angeles will host the 2028 Summer Olympics and Paralympic Games and will become the third city to host the Olympics three times, after London (1908, 1948, 2012) and Paris (1900, 1924, 2024).

1932 Olympic Games

The 1932 Summer Olympics marked the first time Los Angeles staged the Olympic Games. It took place during the Great Depression and the games were reported to have produced a $1 million profit for the city. Los Angeles was the only city to submit a bid for the 1932 edition of the Summer Olympics and was selected as the host city at the 21st IOC Session in Rome in 1923. That same year, Lake Placid hosted the 1932 Winter Olympics. The 1932 Summer Olympics marked the second time the US had hosted the Summer Olympics, with St. Louis hosting the 1904 Summer Olympics.

The United States won a total of 103 medals during the games, including 41 gold medals.

Since the games were the tenth edition of the modern Olympic Games, Tenth Street was renamed Olympic Boulevard. Today Olympic Blvd is home to multiple attractions, such as the Grammy Museum.

1984 Olympic Games

The 1984 Summer Olympics marked the second time Los Angeles had staged the Olympic Games. Much like the 1932 Summer Olympics, Los Angeles was the only city to submit a bid. Los Angeles was elected as the host city at the 80th IOC Session in Athens in 1978. The cost overruns of the 1976 Summer Olympics in Montreal and 1980 Summer Olympics in Moscow discouraged cities to bid. However, Los Angeles depended on existing venues and infrastructure to host the games, in addition to being entirely privately funded, unlike Moscow and Montreal which were funded by their respective governments. The games produced a $200 million profit and are considered the most successful edition of the Olympic Games, as well as the model for the future editions.

The Games were boycotted by fourteen Eastern Bloc countries, including the Soviet Union. Romania and Yugoslavia however, did not take part in the boycott and competed at the 1984 Summer Olympics. The United States and many allied nations had boycotted the 1980 Summer Olympics in Moscow four years earlier, protesting Soviet activity in Afghanistan.

The United States won a total of 174 medals, including 83 gold medals.

2028 Olympic Games

Los Angeles will host the 2028 Summer Olympics. This will mark the third time the Olympic Games are held in Los Angeles. The city will join London and Paris as the only cities to have hosted the Olympics three times.

Upon the USOC reaching a new revenue sharing agreement with the IOC, Los Angeles had been mentioned as a possible bidding city for the 2024 Summer Olympics. In March 2013, Mayor Antonio Villaraigosa sent a letter to the USOC confirming the city's interest in bidding for the 2024 Olympics. On September 1, 2015 Los Angeles was chosen as the U.S. candidate to bid for the 2024 Summer Olympics after the USOC withdrew Boston's bid for the 2024 Olympics. After Rome, Hamburg and Budapest withdrew their bids for the 2024 Olympics, only Los Angeles and Paris remained in the race. The IOC then decided to award both Paris and Los Angeles with future editions of the Olympic Games. In July 2017, an agreement was made which secured the 2024 Olympics for Paris and the 2028 Olympics for Los Angeles. Both cities were unanimously elected at the 131st IOC Session in Lima on September 13, 2017.

2028 Paralympic Games
The 2028 Summer Paralympics will be held in Los Angeles. This will mark the first time the Paralympic Games are held in Los Angeles. After Los Angeles hosted the 1984 Summer Olympics, the 1984 Summer Paralympics were held in New York City and Stoke Mandeville. This was before the Olympics and Paralympics were held in the same host city.

Unsuccessful bids
Aside from securing the right to host the 1932, 1984 and 2028 Summer Olympics, Los Angeles has made frequent Olympic bids in the past. Out of the ten bids which the USOC had submitted to the IOC over the years, seven previous official bids were unsuccessful. Los Angeles submitted bids for the 1924, 1928, 1948, 1952, 1956, 1976 and 1980 Summer Olympics, but lost to Paris, Amsterdam, London, Helsinki, Melbourne, Montreal and Moscow respectively.

Los Angeles had expressed interest to the USOC about bidding for the Olympics on multiple occasions, while failing to secure the USOC's support. Seventeen years after hosting the 1984 Olympics, the city became interested in bidding for the 2012 Summer Olympics, but the USOC chose to submit New York City's bid to the IOC. New York ultimately lost to London. Los Angeles later bid to be the US candidate for the 2016 Summer Olympics, but the USOC decided to submit Chicago's bid to the IOC. Chicago ultimately lost to Rio de Janeiro. Following Chicago's defeat, Los Angeles again expressed interest in bidding for a future edition of the Olympic Games. In November 2011 a delegation from Los Angeles attended a seminar at the IOC headquarters for cities interested in bidding on future editions of the Olympic Games. The USOC declined to submit a bid for the 2020 Summer Olympics, which was ultimately won by Tokyo. In February 2012, Los Angeles hosted the 5th IOC World Conference on Women and Sport which was attended by then-IOC President Jacques Rogge as well as IOC members. At the conference Mayor Antonio Villaraigosa and IOC Member Anita DeFrantz stated that the city would be interested in hosting the Olympic Games a third time.

FIFA Tournaments 

The Greater Los Angeles Area has hosted three FIFA-designated soccer tournaments and is set to host matches during the 2026 FIFA World Cup. Following the 2026 FIFA World Cup, the LA area will have hosted the FIFA World Cup and the FIFA Women's World Cup two times each.

1994 FIFA World Cup 

In 1994 the United States hosted the FIFA World Cup. The Rose Bowl in Pasadena hosted eight matches, including the final where Brazil defeated Italy 3–2 on penalties.

2026 FIFA World Cup 
Los Angeles is among the 16 host cities for the 2026 FIFA World Cup that will 
be held in three different countries, the United States, Canada and Mexico. SoFi Stadium will host matches and is also a possible candidate for the tournament final. SoFi Stadium is one of sixteen host cities set to host matches, eleven of which are in the US. SoFi Stadium is one of two venues in California which will host matches, the other being Levi's Stadium in the San Francisco Bay Area.

1999 FIFA Women's World Cup 
Los Angeles was one of the host cities for the 1999 FIFA Women's World Cup. The Rose Bowl hosted four matches during the 1999 FIFA Women's World Cup including the final where the United States defeated China 5–4 on penalties.

2003 FIFA Women's World Cup 
The United States hosted the FIFA Women's World Cup again in 2003 after China withdrew as hosts due to the SARS outbreak. The Home Depot Center, now known as Dignity Health Sports Park, in Carson was one of the venues that was used in the event. The venue hosted six games, including the final where Germany defeated Sweden 2–1 in sudden death.

International Tournaments 
Throughout the history of Los Angeles, international sporting events aside from the Olympic Games and FIFA World Cup tournaments have also taken place in the region. Los Angeles has been a hub for international sports for decades.

Other soccer tournaments 
Apart from hosting FIFA World Cup tournaments, the LA area has hosted several other soccer tournaments as well. The Rose Bowl hosted three matches during the 2016 Copa América and has hosted matches during the CONCACAF Gold Cup on multiple occasions. Dignity Health Sports Park in Carson as well as the Los Angeles Memorial Coliseum have also hosted matches during the CONCACAF Gold Cup over the years. The 2023 CONCACAF Gold Cup Final will be held at SoFi Stadium on July 16, 2023.

Boxing 
Boxing matches have been held throughout the Greater Los Angeles Area. Venues that have held boxing matches include Ocean Park Arena, Hollywood Legion Stadium, Naud Junction, Grand Olympic Auditorium, Los Angeles Memorial Coliseum, Wrigley Field, Dodger Stadium, Valley Garden Arena, Los Angeles Memorial Sports Arena, Kia Forum, Honda Center, Microsoft Theater, Crypto.com Arena and Dignity Health Sports Park.

Los Angeles Marathon 

The Los Angeles Marathon is a running event held in the spring of each calendar year. it is a foot race run over a 26.2 mi (42.2 km) course takes the runners from Dodger Stadium across the City of Los Angeles to a scenic finish just steps from the Santa Monica Pier. Ever since it was first launched after the summer Olympics 1984, it has been an attracted place for professional as well as amateurs athletics from all over the world with a capacity of 24000 making it the fifth-largest-running event in the United States.

ISA World Surfing Games & US Open of Surfing
Often referred to as "Surf City, USA", Huntington Beach is a popular destination for Surfing and surf competitions.

The ISA World Surfing Games have been held in Huntington Beach on four occasions. The 2022 ISA World Surfing Games were the most recent edition of the games to be held in Huntington Beach. They were held from September 16 to September 24, 2022. The ISA World Surfing Games were previously held in Huntington Beach in 2006, 1996 and in 1984.

Huntington Beach also hosts the annual US Open of Surfing.

1972 & 2015 Special Olympics 
Los Angeles has served as host of the Special Olympics on two occasions.

Los Angeles first hosted the Special Olympics World Summer Games in 1972. Los Angeles hosted the Special Olympics for a second time in 2015, which were held between July 24 to August 2, 2015.

2003 World Artistic Gymnastics Championships 

The 2003 World Artistic Gymnastics Championships were held at the Honda Center in Anaheim. It was the 37th edition of the World Artistic Gymnastics Championships.

2009 World Figure Skating Championships 

The 2009 World Figure Skating Championships were held at the Staples Center in Los Angeles in March 2009.

2010 Pan Pacific Swimming Championships 

The William Woollett Jr. Aquatics Center in Irvine hosted the 2010 Pan Pacific Swimming Championships, which was the eleventh edition of the Pan Pacific Swimming Championships.

2013 & 2016 League of Legends World Championships 
Los Angeles has played host to the 2013 and 2016 League of Legends World Championship Finals.

2016 ICC World Cricket League Division Four 
The 2016 ICC World Cricket League Division Four tournament was held at the Leo Magnus Cricket Complex in Woodley Park, Van Nuys, Los Angeles between October 28 and November 5, 2016, involving national teams from Bermuda, Denmark, Italy, Jersey, Oman, and the United States.

U.S. Open 2023 
After 75 years of being held in other US locations, the U.S. Open will be back to Los Angeles in 2023. The tournament will be held at Los Angeles Country Club.

2031 and 2033 Rugby World Cups

Los Angeles is amongst the cities being considered for hosting matches during the 2031 Rugby World Cup and 2033 Women's Rugby World Cup.

National Tournaments 

The LA area has hosted many national tournaments throughout history, including eight Super Bowls and six MLB All Star Games.

Super Bowls 
The Super Bowl is the annual championship game of the National Football League (NFL) typically played annually between the champion of the National Football Conference (NFC) and the American Football Conference (AFC). The Los Angeles area has hosted the Super Bowl eight times in three different venues; the Los Angeles Memorial Coliseum, the Rose Bowl and SoFi Stadium. The city ranks third on the list of having hosted the most number of Super Bowls, after Miami and New Orleans.

Los Angeles hosted the Super Bowl for an eighth time with Super Bowl LVI in 2022 at SoFi Stadium where the Los Angeles Rams defeated the Cincinnati Bengals 23–20. It was the first Rams Super Bowl win while based in Los Angeles and the second-ever instance of a team winning the Super Bowl in its home stadium, the first being Super Bowl LV where the Tampa Bay Buccaneers won the championship in Raymond James Stadium in 2021.

MLB All-Star Games 
The Major League Baseball All-Star Game, also known as the "Midsummer Classic", is an annual professional baseball game sanctioned by Major League Baseball (MLB) contested between the All-Stars from the American League (AL) and National League (NL). The Los Angeles metropolitan area has hosted the MLB All-Star Game six times.

NBA All-Star Games 

The LA Area has hosted the NBA All-Star Game on six occasions in three different venues. The 1963 NBA All-Star Game was held at the Los Angeles Memorial Sports Arena which was the first NBA All-Star Game to be held in the LA Area. The 1972 and 1983 NBA All-Star Game were both held at The Forum in Inglewood. The Staples Center at LA Live hosted the 2004, 2011 and the 2018 NBA All-Star Game.

MLS All-Star Games 

The LA area hosted the MLS All-Star Game twice. The 2003 MLS All Star Game was held at the Home Depot Center in Carson and the 2021 MLS All Star Game was held at BMO Stadium.

NHL All-Star Games 

The LA area has hosted the NHL All-Star Game on three occasions. The Kia Forum in Inglewood hosted the 33rd National Hockey League All-Star Game in 1981. The Staples Center hosted the NHL All-Star Game twice; hosting the game in 2002 and in 2017.

Collegiate Tournaments
Home to the University of Southern California and the University of California, Los Angeles as well as other notable universities, the LA area is a hub for collegiate sports. In turn, the LA area hosts a handful of notable collegiate tournaments.

Rose Bowl Game 
Aside from hosting various incarnations of the championship game, the Los Angeles area hosts the annual Tournament of Roses college football game, commonly known as the Rose Bowl Game annually on New Years day. The games takes place at the Rose Bowl Stadium in Pasadena. The game is preceded by the Rose Parade which takes place on Colorado Boulevard.

LA Bowl 

The LA Bowl is a NCAA Division I Football Bowl Subdivision game which is played annually at SoFi Stadium in Inglewood.

2023 College Football Playoff National Championship 
Los Angeles hosted the 9th edition of the College Football Playoff National Championship at SoFi Stadium in Inglewood on January 9, 2023.

See also
Anaheim
Soccer in Los Angeles
List of Los Angeles County Cities
2028 Olympics 
Greater Los Angeles

Notes and references